Leticia Huijara is a Mexican actress who was born in Acapulco, Guerrero, Mexico.

Biography
She was born on 12 September 1967, in Acapulco,  Guerrero where she lived the first five years of life. Since then she has lived in Mexico City. She studied Dramatic Literature and Theatre at the UNAM. She began her acting career in 1987 in the famous work of street theater. Since then she has combined her work in the theater with film and television. She has won several awards among which the Ariel for Best Actress for the film "Por si no te vuelvo a ver" and the award for best leading actress of television that is given by the National Circle of Journalists for the telenovela "Los Sanchez". She has combined her theatrical career with the film, which has been featured in several films among which are: La ley de Herodes, Ciudades oscuras, Sexo por compasión, Por si no te vuelvo a ver, Dos crímenes, Cilantro and Perejil and Lola, among many others. She has been nominated for an Ariel on three occasions, twice as actress and as a lead actress. She was also nominated for the Silver Goddess. In theater, she participated in "Baño de damas"(best female group award association of theater critics and journalists), Venecia, Sueños, Los signos del Zodiaco, Paisaje Interior, En Defensa Propia y la Última Diana, among many others. She was part of the cast of the telenovela Los Sanchez (Best Lead Actress Award 2005 National Circle of Journalists), where she portrayed the character of a woman of high class living circumstances beyond series with a family that does not belong to their social circle. She also worked in telenovelas Montecristo and Demasiado corazón, in addition to various other programs. She directed "Ocho historias de cantina" in the Santa Catarina theater. She has been producing works like "baño de damas" and "los delitos insignificantes", both in the Helénico theatre. In 2009, she debuted "Juntos y Felices", her first work as a playwright.

Filmography

Awards and nominations

TVyNovelas Awards

Ariel Awards

References

External links
 

Mexican film actresses
Mexican telenovela actresses
Living people
Actresses from Guerrero
People from Acapulco
20th-century Mexican actresses
21st-century Mexican actresses
Year of birth missing (living people)